John W. "Fergie" Ferguson (born January 18, 1958) is a Canadian curler.

He played at the 1988 Winter Olympics when curling was a demonstration sport, Canadian men's team won bronze medal.

Awards
Canadian Curling Hall of Fame: inducted in 1992 with all Ed Lukowich 1986 team.

Teams

References

External links

John Ferguson – Curling Canada Stats Archive
John Ferguson - ARCHIVED - Search Results - Canadian Olympians - Library and Archives Canada
John Ferguson Gallery | The Trading Card Database

Living people
1958 births
Curlers from Calgary
Canadian male curlers
Brier champions
Curlers at the 1988 Winter Olympics
Olympic curlers of Canada
World curling champions